(German for "Wanna bet, that..?") is a German-language Saturday entertainment television show. It is the largest and most successful television show in Europe. Its format was the basis for the British show You Bet! and the American show Wanna Bet?

The shows were broadcast live six to eight times a year from different cities in Germany, Austria, and Switzerland. There were also seven open-air summer shows, broadcast from Amphitheatre Xanten, Plaça de Toros de Palma de Mallorca, Disneyland Paris, Waldbühne Berlin, and Aspendos Roman Theatre. Each of the shows, which were shown without commercial interruption, was usually scheduled to last for about two to three hours, but it was not uncommon for a show to run as much as 45 minutes longer.

The game show gained great popularity in the German-speaking countries through the presenters Frank Elstner, who was also the creator, and Thomas Gottschalk in the 80s and 90s. After that, especially due to the takeover of Markus Lanz, the audience ratings dropped significantly, which caused the discontinuation of the show in 2014. From 2021 to probably 2023, Thomas Gottschalk will return for one episode each year.

History 

On 14 February 1981, the German channel ZDF broadcast the first episode in cooperation with the Austrian broadcaster ORF and the Swiss channel SF DRS as an Eurovision network show. The inventor of the show, Frank Elstner, hosted the show until its 39th episode in 1987. Wetten, dass..? has since been hosted by entertainer Thomas Gottschalk, except during a brief interval from 1992 to 1993, when nine episodes were presented by Wolfgang Lippert. Gottschalk hosted his 100th episode of the show on 27 March 2004.

In summer 2007, Wetten, dass..? had its first show in 16:9 widescreen. Since late 2009, Michelle Hunziker has assisted Gottschalk in hosting the show. The show on 27 February 2010 was the first show broadcast in HD. Thomas Gottschalk left the show on 3 December 2011, the end of the 2011 season, because of an accident involving Samuel Koch, a 23-year-old man who became a quadriplegic due to a stunt which he performed on the show on 4 December 2010.

After long speculations who would take over the show, ZDF announced on 11 March 2012 that Markus Lanz would be the next presenter. His first show was on 6 October 2012 and the last show was on 13 December 2014.

The show got a satirical homage with fake bets in 2016 for two episodes of 45 minutes each. It was hosted by comedian Jan Böhmermann.

On 6 November 2021, Gottschalk moderated a one-off repeat of Wetten, dass...?

List of hosts

Concept 
The core gimmick of the show was the bets: ordinary people offer to perform some unusual (often bizarre) and very difficult task. Some examples, all of which were performed successfully, include:
 Lighting a pocket lighter using an excavator's shovel (19 February 1983)
 Assembling a V8 engine from parts and making it run within 9 minutes (2 November 1991)
 13 swimmers towing a 312-tonne ship over a distance of 25 meters (7 October 1995)
 Recognising 5 of 6 (out of a total of 75) species of birds blindfolded by feeling a single feather (9 November 2002)
 A Chinese martial artist pushing a car with a spear, the tip of which was resting on his throat
 A nine-year-old boy from Vienna computing the shortest bus and railcar routes throughout the city from memory
 A blindfolded farmer recognizing his cows by the sound they made while chewing apples

The other major attraction of the show was the top-ranking celebrity guests, with considerable screen time given to the host greeting and chatting with them. Each of the guests had to bet on the outcome of one of the performances and offer a wager, in recent years usually a humorous or mildly humiliating, originally more charitable, activity to be carried out if they lose. Until 1987, each of the celebrities bet on all the performances and the most accurate one was selected to be that show's Wettkönig ("bet king"). Ever since, one of the people performing the task is selected by a telephone vote. Celebrities that have appeared on the show included a vast range of personalities, with repeated guests including the likes of Britney Spears, Jennifer Lopez, Tom Cruise, Angelina Jolie, Cameron Diaz, Naomi Campbell, Michael Douglas, Michael Jackson, Jennifer Aniston, David Beckham, Hugh Grant, Arnold Schwarzenegger, Claudia Schiffer, Heidi Klum, Bill Gates, Karl Lagerfeld, Mikhail Gorbachev, and Gerhard Schröder.

Additionally, until 2001, members of the audience could offer bets against the host to find a certain number of unusual persons (e.g. 10 ladies over the age of 65 driving motorbikes). One of these was selected at the beginning of the show and had to be fulfilled by its end. Since 2001, the host bets against the entire city where the show is held.

Between the bets and the celebrity smalltalk, there were musical performances by top-ranking artists like Phil Collins, Take That, Jennifer Lopez, Coldplay, OneRepublic, Rihanna, Spice Girls, Kiss, t.A.T.u., Whitney Houston, Katy Perry, Madonna, Kylie Minogue, Anastacia, Avril Lavigne, Christina Stürmer, Bryan Adams, Shakira, Britney Spears, Scorpions, Bon Jovi, Meat Loaf, Elton John, Tokio Hotel, Justin Bieber, Miley Cyrus, Ashley Tisdale, Joe Cocker, Lady Gaga, Luciano Pavarotti, Celine Dion, Christina Aguilera, Mariah Carey, Robert Plant, Status Quo, Leona Lewis, David Bowie, Bruno Mars, Cher, Tina Turner, and Michael Jackson.

International versions 
In the Netherlands, a version was broadcast between 1984 and 1999 under the name Wedden, dat..? by the AVRO and (from the early nineties) RTL 4. The Dutch shows were hosted by Jos Brink until 1993, after which Rolf Wouters took over. Reinout Oerlemans presented the show for one season in 1999.

Wetten, dass..? inspired the British series You Bet!. It was produced by London Weekend Television and was broadcast on ITV from 1988 to 1997. The hosts were Bruce Forsyth (1988–1990), Matthew Kelly (1991–1995), and Darren Day (1996–1997).

In October 2004, Wetten, dass..? also started in the Chinese television under the title Wanna Challenge (as gambling is illegal in China). It is shown once a week and reaches 60 million viewers each episode.

In 1998, a Slovenian version of Wetten, dass..? started weekly on POP TV under the title Super Pop hosted by Stojan Auer. There were initiations of close production connections with the original Wetten, dass..?, but the show was canceled because of high production costs before any further common productions were made.

The show was also broadcast with great success in Italy by Rai 1 from 1991 to 1996 (and then in 1999, 2001, and 2003) with the title Scommettiamo che...?. In 2008 it was taken up again by Rai 2. It has had ten seasons.

In 2005 and 2006, a Polish version was broadcast under the name Załóż się.

In 2006 and 2007 a Russian version was broadcast on the Channel One under the name Большой спор (Bolshoy Spor, literally A Big Betting). The host was Dmitry Nagiev. The show was closed after the 7th episode due to its low popularity.

¿Qué Apostamos? was the Spanish version of the show. It originally run on Spain's national broadcaster TVE 1 between 4 May 1993 and 30 June 2000. The show was fronted by Ramón García, accompanied by Ana Obregón (1993–1998), Antonia Dell'Atte (1998–1999), and Raquel Navamuel and Mónica Martínez (2000). If the audience bet was completed, the person that placed the bet had to be drenched in water, and if it was not completed one of the presenters or guests had to take the water shower. In 2008, the Spanish federation of regional TV stations operating under the FORTA umbrella later recovered the format, hosted by Carlos Lozano and Rocío Madrid, but the revival was short lived and was swiftly axed due to low ratings and the high cost of producing the programme.

In 2006, ABC signed with reality producer Phil Gurin of The Gurin Company to develop an American version of the show.  Six episodes were broadcast in July–September 2008, hosted by British duo Ant & Dec. This is not the first time the show has been produced for American audiences; in 1993, CBS broadcast a pilot called Wanna Bet?, hosted by Mark McEwen, which was not picked up as a full series.

There are also plans to show Wetten, dass..? in India, Northern Africa, and the Middle East.

Additional information 

 There was an instance where Frank Elstner lost a private bet himself; he had bet with his family that his colleague and friend Kurt Felix would never fool him. (Kurt Felix ran a show similar to Candid Camera, called Verstehen Sie Spaß? ("Can You Take a Joke?").  On the 29th show (21 September 1985), after a successful outdoor challenge which involved uncorking a bottle of wine and filling four glasses with a gripper claw fixed to a helicopter's skid within the space of  minutes, the pilot was invitedalong with the guestsfor a drink of wine. But the contents of the bottle turned out to be pure vinegar, as Elstner discovered when he was the first to take a sample, and the red-haired and bearded pilot revealed himself to the laughing audience as Kurt Felix in disguise. As Felix would later admit in one of his later Verstehen Sie Spaß? broadcastings, it was he and his production team who had sent the bet to the ZDF in the first place.
 In a special on German TV, Elstner said, Wetten, dass..? had the chance to have Pope John Paul II on the show, but only via video link, not direct in person. Elstner refused, because this could be precedent for future celebrities and famous people to come on the show via video link and not appear in person on the set. Elstner regretted the once-in-a-lifetime chance to have the pope on his show and said it was the greatest mistake of his career.
 Actor Karl-Heinz Böhm initiated his long-time charity project Menschen für Menschen in the 3rd show: Regarding a famine in the Sahel, he said at the end of the show: I bet that not even one third of our viewers in Austria, Switzerland and the Federal Republic of Germany will donate one Deutsche Mark for the starving people in the Sahel. And I want to lose this bet. If he lost, Böhm added, he would himself travel to Africa to hand over the money. Even though Böhm won the bet, as total donations were only around 1.2 million DM, he traveled to Africa and started his aid project for Ethiopia.
 In the 25th show on 15 December 1984, environmental activists ran in front of the cameras with a banner that read "Nicht wettenDonauauen retten" ("Don't betsave the Danube wetlands"). When they were pulled out of the way by the show's security, Frank Elstner commanded that no one was to be thrown out of his show. He let the activists make their request and they left the show peacefully. The banner was for the then Austrian chancellor Fred Sinowatz, who was a guest on that show.
 In the 48th show on 3 September 1988, an editor of the German satirical magazine Titanic, Bernd Fritz, snuck into the show as a contestant under the pseudonym Thomas Rautenberg. The real Thomas Rautenberg, a graphic artist from Munich, offered his bet to Wetten, dass..?, to see how the ZDF would react. He claimed to recognize the colour of pencils by tasting them. Bernd Fritz took the bet to the show and won the bet. However he admitted he was cheating and the solution of how he did it could be read in the next issue of Titanic. Gottschalk then told the audience that he would read the magazine, and tell the trick in the next show, so that the magazine wouldn't get the publicity from this stunt. It was later explained that the blacked ski goggles that contestants wear if they need their vision removed for the bet, were adjusted by Fritz so he could peek through a gap along his nose to see the colour of the pencil. The host tested the visibility through the goggles by faking punches against Fritz eyes and seeing if he would try to dodge them, but after the test it seemed as if Fritz adjusted the goggles to a more comfortable position before he attempted the bet. Since then, swimming goggles with a rubber sealing that sticks to the skin have been used.
 In a show in 1992, actress Whoopi Goldberg came onto the show for a bet. Goldberg lost and as a result, she had to cast Gottschalk in her next movie. That movie was Sister Act 2: Back in the Habit where Gottschalk played the German cook, Father Wolfgang.
 In the 102nd show on 8 December 1996, a live bet at the Russian space station Mir was planned. The cosmonauts wanted to decorate a Christmas tree in zero gravity in two minutes. Because of technical problems, however, the station couldn't be contacted during the show.
 Salma Hayek is credited for restarting the popular trend of wearing Trachten (German for costumes, specifically Lederhosen for men and Dirndl for women). Wearing Trachten to the Oktoberfest wasn't fashionable for several decades after the second World War, and most of visitors wore the regular clothes. She appeared on the show on 5 October 2008. Salma would have to dress in a Dirndl if she was wrong. Salma decided that the boy would not be successful in assembling a tower of 20 beer crates placed upon one after one and climbing up. The boy failed his mission so Salma didn't have to wear the Dirndl presented to her. In a surprise move, Salma indicated she would like to try on Dirndl and see how it looked on her. The audience erupted in applause as she walked off the stage. When she returned to the stage with her Dirndl, Karl Lagerfeld was applauding so loudly and couldn't stop looking at her Dirndl. Salma commented how besotted she was about Dirndl and wanted to keep it.

Cancellation and Revival

Samuel Koch incident

Samuel Koch, a 23-year-old aspiring stuntman-turned-actor, became a quadriplegic during a stunt performed on the show on 4 December 2010. The incident was broadcast live on German television. Koch took on a challenge to jump over five moving cars of gradually increasing size using spring-loaded boots. Koch failed to clear the fourth car, driven by his own father. Koch's head hit the windshield and he landed on the studio floor, fracturing two cervical vertebrae and damaging his spinal cord. 

Koch survived after emergency surgery, but as of 2021 he is permanently paralyzed from the neck down.  The episode was suspended and then taken off air about 20 minutes later, for the first time in the program's history. In the following episode host Thomas Gottschalk announced his resignation, leaving after the last installment of the 2011 season.

Decline
Following Gottschalk's retirement, ZDF TV host Markus Lanz took over the hosting of the show (debuting on 6 October 2012). However, his approach to the show did not meet public or critical approval, causing the show to experience a drastic ratings loss. Eventually, with the conclusion of the 2014 Offenburg show (5 April 2014), it was announced that the show would be cancelled at the close of 2014, official statements claiming "out-moded concepts" as the main reason for this decision. This announcement drew protests from both Frank Elstner and Thomas Gottschalk. However, it was also stated that an eventual revival would be considered.

The 215th and last regular show was broadcast on 13 December 2014 from Nuremberg, with Samuel Koch – who never blamed Wetten, dass..? or Gottschalk for his condition – being one of the prominent guests.

Revival
On 28 July 2018, ZDF announced a one-evening revival of Wetten, dass..?, owing to the occasion of Gottschalk's upcoming 70th birthday (18 May 2020). It was later announced that the special would not happen in 2020 due to the COVID-19 pandemic. It was instead relegated to air live on 6 November 2021. The special became an instant ratings hit, scoring nearly 14 million views, prompting ZDF to consider a full comeback of the show.

With the success of the 2021 show, another broadcast of Wetten, dass...? was scheduled for 15 November 2022 out of Friedrichshafen, hosted once again by Thomas Gottschalk.

See also 
 Banzai (TV series)
 The Late, Late Breakfast Show, British show cancelled in 1986 after a fatal audience stunt

References

External links 
  (in German)
 
 ZDF.de: Thomas Gottschalk announces departure from "Wetten, dass..?" (in German)

1981 German television series debuts
German game shows
2014 German television series endings
Television shows about gambling
ZDF original programming
1990s German television series
2000s German television series
German-language television shows
1980s game shows
1990s game shows
2000s game shows
2010s game shows